Marsden Bay is a locality and bay at the south head of Whangārei Harbour in Northland, New Zealand. The western side of Marsden Bay is a coastal community called One Tree Point, and the eastern side is the industrial development of Marsden Point. Ruakākā lies about 9 km to the south.

The Māori name for the area is Te Poupouwhenua.

History

The town of Marsden, situated where Marsden Point is now, was originally intended to be the commercial centre for the district, due to the access to deep water, and because it was closer to Auckland than the area which is now Whangārei. The government purchased  on the point in the mid-1850s and laid it out in quarter-acre sections. The development of the kauri gum industry changed the focus of settlement to Whangarei.

The Marsden Point oil refinery was built in the 1960s and expanded in the 1980s.

Demographics
The current population lives at the One Tree Point end of the area.

Marsden Bay had a population of 2,208 at the 2018 New Zealand census, an increase of 714 people (47.8%) since the 2013 census, and an increase of 1,209 people (121.0%) since the 2006 census. There were 843 households, comprising 1,074 males and 1,137 females, giving a sex ratio of 0.94 males per female. The median age was 47.5 years (compared with 37.4 years nationally), with 423 people (19.2%) aged under 15 years, 234 (10.6%) aged 15 to 29, 972 (44.0%) aged 30 to 64, and 579 (26.2%) aged 65 or older.

Ethnicities were 86.5% European/Pākehā, 19.3% Māori, 3.1% Pacific peoples, 3.9% Asian, and 2.0% other ethnicities. People may identify with more than one ethnicity.

The percentage of people born overseas was 20.7, compared with 27.1% nationally.

Although some people chose not to answer the census's question about religious affiliation, 52.9% had no religion, 36.3% were Christian, 0.8% were Hindu, 0.1% were Muslim, 0.5% were Buddhist and 2.3% had other religions.

Of those at least 15 years old, 294 (16.5%) people had a bachelor's or higher degree, and 360 (20.2%) people had no formal qualifications. The median income was $31,800, compared with $31,800 nationally. 384 people (21.5%) earned over $70,000 compared to 17.2% nationally. The employment status of those at least 15 was that 774 (43.4%) people were employed full-time, 234 (13.1%) were part-time, and 45 (2.5%) were unemployed.

Notes

Whangarei District
Populated places in the Northland Region